DIRT (Death Is Reality Today) were an English anarcho-punk band from London, England.  Initially formed in 1980 (with a core line-up of Gary Buckley, Deno, Fox, Lou and Vomit), the band frequently played with fellow anarchists Crass, before releasing their first EP, Object, Refuse, Reject, Abuse on the Crass Records label. Their second release, Never Mind Dirt, Here's the Bollocks, also on the Crass label, was a live LP released in 1983.  The band went into a brief hiatus after 1982 when they took to the road again (Gary and Deno recruiting new members Stuart, Paul and Richard) and recorded the Just An Error album, after which they split in 1986.

Gary and Deno reconvened the band again in 1992 and began touring extensively which resulted in the Drunks in Rusty Transits album after which the band was dissolved. Singer Gxist (Gary) later formed Stratford Mercenaries with Steve Ignorant of Crass and Ed "Eddafed" Addley from  Suicidal Supermarket Trolleys. The original bass player, Vomit (Vincent Learoyd), went on to form Earth Culture, a neo-pagan band before writing the novel The Laila Mythology in 2013, collaborating on the book trailer with founder Crass member Penny Rimbaud.

Discography
Chart placings shown are from the UK Indie Chart.

EPs
Object Refuse Reject Abuse (7", 1982) (No. 4)
Feast or Famine (MC, 1993)
Scent of The Kill (7", 1994)
Beast or Burden? (7", 1994)

LPs
Never Mind Dirt Here's The Bollocks (1983) (No. 4)
Just an Error (1985)
Drunks in Rusty Transits (1995)

Compilations
Black & White (2xLP/2xCD, 1995)

References

External links
 Dirt website

Anarcho-punk groups
British crust and d-beat groups
English punk rock groups
1980 establishments in England
1986 disestablishments in England
Musical groups established in 1980
Musical groups reestablished in 1992
Musical groups disestablished in 1995